Veronica officinalis, the heath speedwell, common gypsyweed, common speedwell, or Paul's betony, is a species of flowering plant in the plantain family Plantaginaceae. It is native to Europe and western Asia. It has been introduced to North America and is widely naturalised there.

Description

It flowers from May until August.

Cultivation and uses
This speedwell grows in open areas, such as fields, meadows and gardens, where it is sometimes grown as an edible, or medicinal herb.

The slightly bitter and astringent taste and tea-like smell of speedwell led to its use as a tea substitute in 19th-century France, where it was called thé d'Europe, or "Europe tea". The French still use this term as a name for speedwell.

References

External links

Skye Flora

Medicinal plants
officinalis
Flora of Europe
Flora of the Caucasus
Flora of Western Asia
Plants described in 1753
Taxa named by Carl Linnaeus